Little Pine Lake is located east of Brantingham, New York. The outlet creek flows into Middle Branch. Fish species present in the lake are brook trout, black bullhead, white sucker, and sunfish. No motors are allowed on this lake.

References

Lakes of New York (state)